Psychrobacter pygoscelis is a Gram-negative and rod-shaped bacterium from the genus Psychrobacter which has been isolated from the trachea of a penguin (Pygoscelis papua) from the Fildes Bay.

References

Moraxellaceae
Bacteria described in 2020